Acquarone  is an Italian surname. Notable people with the surname include:

Lorenzo Acquarone (1931-2020), Italian politician
Luciano Acquarone (born 1930), Italian athlete
Orestes Acquarone (1875-1952), Uruguayan artist
Pietro Acquarone (1917-1993), Italian footballer
Romeo Acquarone (1895–1980), French tennis player

Italian-language surnames